The 1974–75 season was the 89th season in the history of Luton Town Football Club. It was Luton Town's 55th consecutive season in the Football League, and their 58th overall. It was also the team's first season in the First Division since 1959–60, and their sixth overall. The season saw Luton narrowly relegated back to Division Two.

This article covers the period from 1 July 1974 to 30 June 1975.

Background

Following promotion from the Fourth Division in 1966–67, Luton consolidated under first Allan Brown, then Alec Stock before rising another division following a successful 1969–70 campaign in which Malcolm Macdonald scored 28 goals. Macdonald scored 31 during 1970–71 as Luton finished sixth in the Second Division, and was sold to Newcastle United at the end of the season to ease the club's financial worries. Harry Haslam replaced Stock in 1972, and along with him came the ambition to return to Division One after a 12-year absence. Luton fans would have to wait two more years for Haslam to deliver the third promotion; in 1973–74 the team finished second in Division Two behind Middlesbrough, and ensured that for 1974–75 Luton would be a top division club once again.

Review

July–September

After failing to progress past the group stage of the Texaco Cup, Luton began the campaign badly. The first victory came in the League Cup, as Luton beat Bristol Rovers on 11 September; in the league, a series of losses and draws prevailed. On the 28th, Luton finally won a league match, beating Carlisle United 3–1. This win lifted Luton out of the relegation places, and up to 17th in the division.

October–December

The team then went 11 matches without a victory, including a run of six straight defeats. Luton crashed out of the League Cup and by mid-December, they were bottom of the league and eight points away from safety. Starting with a 1–0 home win over Derby County, Luton suddenly won three successive matches and reduced the gap to five points.

January–March

A draw with Chelsea meant that Luton came off the foot of the table, but it was followed by defeat in the FA Cup to Birmingham City. A disappointing home loss at the hands of Burnley sent Luton straight back to the bottom of the league, and put them six points behind 19th placed Chelsea. A draw at Sheffield United, followed by a victory over Newcastle United and another draw with Stoke City, saw Luton come within four points of survival. A 3–1 defeat at Everton on 25 February resulted in no further ground being made up.

Two more straight defeats followed, and the gap remained four points. Luton then won three matches on the trot, against Carlisle, Leeds and Arsenal, to be only two points behind Chelsea. The team were brought back down to earth sharply towards the end of March by a 5–0 annihilation at Derby County and a 5–2 defeat at Wolverhampton Wanderers – these put Luton back down to 21st, though still only three points behind Leicester City in 19th.

April–May

Defeat at Tottenham Hotspur on 5 April sent Luton back to the bottom of the league and increased the gap to five points with only eight left to gain from Luton's final four matches. Luton managed a 2–1 home win over Everton, before beating Leicester 3–0 to be only one point away. A 4–1 victory at Birmingham put Luton level on points with Tottenham, with the North London team ahead on goal average. Manchester City would visit Luton on 26 April for their final match, while Tottenham would have to travel to Highbury to face their rivals Arsenal before entertaining Leeds United two days later. Luton could only draw with Manchester City, while Tottenham were defeated 1–0 at Arsenal; Luton therefore rose out of the relegation zone for the first time since October. However, Tottenham beat Leeds 4–2 on the 28th, and therefore leapfrogged Luton into 19th place. Thus, Luton were sentenced to Division Two football in 1975–76.

Match results 

Luton Town results given first.

Legend

Football League First Division

FA Cup

Football League Cup

Texaco Cup

League table

Player details 
Last match played on 26 April 1975.
Players arranged in order of starts (in all competitions), with the greater number of substitute appearances taking precedence in case of an equal number of started matches.

See also
1974–75 in English football

References
General
Player and match statistics and league table sourced from: 
Match statistics sourced from: 
Background sourced from: 

Specific

Luton Town F.C. seasons
Luton Town